FSC15307+3253 (or IRAS F15307+3252) is an ultraluminous infrared galaxy (ULIRG), with a luminosity between 8 and 1000 µm of approximately 2 L⊙, possibly the highest currently known.  The "FSC" refers to Faint Source Catalogue, one of the source catalogs produced by the IRAS infrared survey mission.  The emission is believed due to some combination of starburst activity and accretion onto a super-massive black hole, producing primary radiation at shorter wavelengths which is mostly blocked by obscuring dust, which is in turn heated and re-radiates in the infrared.  The redshift of the source is z = 0.93, indicating a distance of the order of 7 billion light years.

References

Starburst galaxies
Luminous infrared galaxies
Corona Borealis